Christopher Pizzey (born 23 December 1976) is a British actor and comedian from London, best known for playing Mr. Stephen in the CBBC series The Basil Brush Show.

Early life
Pizzey was born and raised in London and graduated from the Rose Bruford College.

Career
Pizzey's first notable appearance was as Keith in episode 11.9 of TV series London's Burning. His next appearance was as Busyboy in the Doc Martin TV series. He then appeared in the UK film Anomaly in 2005 as Captain Dale Waxman.

His most long-standing appearance was as Basil Brush's sidekick Mr Stephen in the 2002 remake of the classic Basil Brush show from 2002 to 2005. He appeared from series one to series four as one of the four main characters who all lived in the same flat. This show was regularly repeated on the CBBC Channel until the programme ceased to be aired in the late 2000s.

He has also appeared in the BBC soap EastEnders as the character of Andy in a 2006 episode and the Roman Mysteries episode of The Pirates of Pompeii (2007) as the character of Actius for one episode along with an appearance in the BBC daytime drama Doctors in May 2007 as well as appearing in a stage production of Wind in the Willows at the West Yorkshire Playhouse, Leeds as Mole. In November 2008, Christopher appeared in an episode of The Bill playing Richard O'Leary, a man whose car was stolen. He also appeared as Sarah Jane's father, Eddie Smith, in Episodes 9 and 10 of The Sarah Jane Adventures.

Pizzey starred in the 2007 feature film The Shrine, directed by Duncan Catterall and co-starring Natasha Coulter and Greg Chapman.

He also stars in the Basil Brush co-star Ajay Chhabra's television show Planet Ajay, in which he plays one of the regulars, "Mr Killjoy".

Personal life
Pizzey is of English and Italian heritage.

Filmography

Film

Television

Web series

Radio

Theatre
 Biloxi Blues as Don Carney (National Youth Theatre)
 By Jeeves as Bingo Little (New Vic Theatre)
 Cinderella as Buttons (Spillers Pantomime)
 Into the Woods as Jack (Donmar Warehouse)
 Dick Whittington as Dick Whittington (Richmond Theatre)
 Dick Whittington as Sleepy Jack (Salisbury Playhouse)
 Ham as Paul Matthews (New Vic Theatre)
 Jack and the Beanstalk as Simple Simon (UK Productions)
 On The Piste as Dave Trueman (Derby Theatre)
 Peter Pan as Smee (UK Productions)
 The Basil Brush Theatre Show as Mr Stephen (Basil Brush Ltd)
 The Demon Headmaster as Lloyd Hunter (Churchill Theatre)
 The Wind in the Willows as Mole (West Yorkshire Playhouse)
 Sleeping Beauty as Silly Billy (UK Productions)
 Up on the Roof as Tim (Oldham Coliseum Theatre)
 Vincent in Brixton as Sam Plowman (Manchester Central Library)
 Zigger Zagger as Harry (Royal National Theatre)

References

External links
 

1976 births
20th-century English comedians
21st-century English comedians
20th-century British male actors
21st-century British male actors
British people of Italian descent
British male film actors
British male radio actors
English male stage actors
British male television actors
Living people
English male soap opera actors
Male actors from London
Alumni of Rose Bruford College